Foote is a surname. It may also refer to:

 , three vessels named after Rear Admiral Foote
 Foote Gower (1725/6–1780), English cleric, academic and antiquarian
 Foote, Mississippi, United States, an unincorporated community
 Fort Foote, an American Civil War fort defending Washington, DC
 Foote Islands, Antarctica

See also
 Foote Dam, Michigan, United States
 Foote Field, a multi-purpose sports facility on the University of Alberta campus, Edmonton, Alberta, Canada
 Foot (disambiguation)